is the memorial shrine of Date Masamune, located in Aoba-ku, Sendai, Miyagi Prefecture, Japan, near the site of the former Aoba Castle. The shrine was built in 1873 by petition of former retainers of the Date clan of former Sendai Domain to enshrine the deified spirit (kami) of Date Masamune under the name of Takefuruhiko-no-mikoto. This was in accordance with a practice which began in the Bakumatsu period and continued into the early Meiji period of establishing a shrine to the founders of the daimyō clan which ruled each feudal domain under the Tokugawa shogunate. Under the State Shinto ranking system, the shrine was designated as a prefectural shrine.

The current Honden dates from 1927. The torii gate was damaged in the 2011 Tōhoku earthquake and tsunami.

Its current chief priest is Katakura Shigenobu, the 16th hereditary chieftain of the Katakura clan, who served as castellans of Shirakawa Castle under the Date clan.

References

External links
 
Pictures of Aoba Jinja

Buildings and structures in Sendai
Shinto shrines in Miyagi Prefecture
Date clan
1873 establishments in Japan